Events from the year 1944 in Scotland.

Incumbents 

 Secretary of State for Scotland and Keeper of the Great Seal – Tom Johnston

Law officers 
 Lord Advocate – James Reid
 Solicitor General for Scotland – Sir David King Murray

Judiciary 
 Lord President of the Court of Session and Lord Justice General – Lord Normand
 Lord Justice Clerk – Lord Cooper
 Chairman of the Scottish Land Court – Lord Gibson

Events 
 17 February – Kirkcaldy Burghs by-election is held. The Scottish National Party candidate Douglas Young comes close to winning the seat (which is retained by Labour candidate, Thomas Hubbard).
 26–30 June – World War II: the 15th (Scottish) Infantry Division spearhead Operation Epsom, also known as the First Battle of the Odon, during the Battle of Normandy.
 September – Churchill Barriers on Orkney completed, together with the Italian Chapel on Lamb Holm.
 9 November – The House of the Binns (near Linlithgow) becomes the first estate house given to the National Trust for Scotland (by Eleanor Dalyell).
 12 November – World War II: sinking of the German battleship Tirpitz at Tromsø by Lancaster bombers of No. 9 and 617 Squadrons flying from RAF Lossiemouth.
 30 November –  is launched at John Brown & Company's shipyard at Clydebank by the Princess Elizabeth. The Royal Navy's largest, fastest and last battleship, she was laid down in October 1941 and will be in commission from 1946 to 1960.
 December – 97 Italians tunnel out of a prisoner-of-war camp at Doonfoot but are quickly recaptured.

Births 
 23 January – John McCluskey, boxer (died 2015)
 31 January – Robin Murray, psychiatrist
 19 February – Ron Mathewson, jazz double bassist and bass guitarist (died 2020)
 25 February – Campbell Armstrong (born Thomas Campbell Black), novelist (died 2013 in Ireland)
 2 March – Stuart McGugan, actor
 11 March – Graham Lyle, singer-songwriter
 23 March – Maoilios Caimbeul (Myles Campbell) writer of poetry, prose and children's literature in Scottish Gaelic
 19 April – Andrew Welsh, Scottish National Party politician (died 2021)
 3 May – Carl Forgione, actor (died 1998 in England)
 13 May – Vivien Heilbron, actress
 17 May – Jimmy Boyle, sculptor, writer and murderer
 5 June – Jim Brogan, footballer (died 2018)
 3 July – Paul Young, actor
 7 July – George Logan, stage entertainer
 8 August – Robert Smith, Baron Smith of Kelvin, businessman, chairman of the Green Investment Bank
 17 August – Bobby Murdoch, international footballer (died 2001)
 22 August – Tom Leonard, poet (died 2018)
 13 September – Leslie Harvey, rock guitarist (died 1972)
 21 September – Susan Fleetwood, stage, film and television actress (died 1995 in England)
 21 September – Christopher Harvie, historian and Scottish National Party politician
 23 September – Eric Bogle, folk singer-songwriter in Australia
 30 September – Jimmy Johnstone, international footballer (died 2006)
 3 October – Harry Hood, footballer (died 2019)
 17 November – Malcolm Bruce, Liberal politician
 23 November – Christopher Rush, writer
 28 November – James Smillie, actor and singer
 12 December – Kenneth Cranham, actor
 29 December – Gilbert Adair, novelist, poet, film critic and journalist (died 2011 in London)
 Alison Fell, poet and novelist
 Shena Mackay, novelist

Deaths 
 8 February – John Watson, advocate and sheriff, Solicitor General for Scotland 1929–31 (born 1883; dies on train to Scotland)
 29 February - Durward Lely, opera singer and actor (born 1852)
 16 March – David Prain, botanist (born 1857)
 23 June - J. Storer Clouston, author and historian (born 1870 in Cumberland)
 5 July – Robert William Hamilton, Liberal politician and MP (born 1867)
 6 July - Alexander Lorne Campbell, architect (born 1871)
 11 July – Sir Daniel Macaulay Stevenson, shipbroker, Liberal politician and philanthropist (born 1851)
 11 August  – William Fife, yacht designer (born 1857)
 16 August – Walter Robberds, Bishop of Brechin and Primus of the Scottish Episcopal Church (born 1863 in the British Raj)
 27 September – David Dougal Williams, painter (born 1888 in England)

See also 
 Timeline of Scottish history
 1944 in Northern Ireland

References 

 
1940s in Scotland
Years of the 20th century in Scotland
Scotland